The 59th Writers Guild of America Awards honored the best film and television writers of 2006.

Winners and nominees

Film

Best Adapted Screenplay
The Departed - William Monahan
Borat: Cultural Learnings of America for Make Benefit Glorious Nation of Kazakhstan - Sacha Baron Cohen, Anthony Hines, Peter Baynham and Dan Mazer
The Devil Wears Prada - Aline Brosh McKenna
Little Children - Todd Field and Tom Perrotta
Thank You for Smoking - Jason Reitman

Best Original Screenplay
Little Miss Sunshine - Michael Arndt
Babel - Guillermo Arriaga
The Queen - Peter Morgan
Stranger than Fiction - Zach Helm
United 93 - Paul Greengrass

Best Adapted Documentary Feature Screenplay
Deliver Us from Evil – Amy J. Berg
The Heart of the Game – Ward Serrill
Once in a Lifetime: The Extraordinary Story of the New York Cosmos – Mark Monroe; story by Mark Monroe and John Dower
Who Killed The Electric Car? – Chris Paine
Why We Fight – Eugene Jarecki

Television

Dramatic Series
The Sopranos - Mitchell Burgess, David Chase, Diane Frolov, Robin Green, Andrew Schneider, Matthew Weiner, Terence Winter
24 - Robert Cochran, Manny Coto, Duppy Demetrius, David Ehrman, David Fury, Howard Gordon, Evan Katz, Stephen Kronish, Michael Loceff, Matt Michnovetz, Steve Mitchell, Sam Montgomery, Nicole Ranadive, Joel Surnow, Craig W. Van Sickle
Deadwood - W. Earl Brown, Regina Corrado, Alix Lambert, Ted Mann, Bernadette McNamara, David Milch, Kem Nunn, Nick Towne, Zack Whedon
Grey's Anatomy - Debora Cahn, Zoanne A. Clack, Allan Heinberg, Elizabeth Klaviter, Kip Koenig, Stacy McKee, Carolina Paiz, James D. Parriott, Tony Phelan, Joan Rater, Shonda Rhimes, Blythe Robe, Mimi Schmir, Gabrielle Stanton, Krista Vernoff, Harry Werksman, Mark Wilding
Lost - J. J. Abrams, Monica Owusu-Breen, Carlton Cuse, Leonard Dick, Drew Goddard, Javier Grillo-Marxuach, Adam Horowitz, Dawn Lambertsen Kelly, Christina M. Kim, Edward Kitsis, Damon Lindelof, Steven Maeda, Jeff Pinkner, Matt Ragghianti, Elizabeth Sarnoff, Alison Schapker

Episodic Drama
"Pilot" - Big Love - Mark V. Olsen and Will Scheffer
"Election Day Part II" - The West Wing - Eli Attie and John Wells
"Occupation"/"Precipice" - Battlestar Galactica - Ronald D. Moore
"Two for the Road" - Lost - Elizabeth Sarnoff and Christina M. Kim
"The End of the Whole Mess" - Nightmares and Dreamscapes: From the Stories of Stephen King - Stephen King 
"Pilot" - Studio 60 on the Sunset Strip - Aaron Sorkin

Comedy Series
The Office - Steve Carell, Jennifer Celotta, Greg Daniels, Lee Eisenberg, Brent Forrester, Ricky Gervais, Mindy Kaling, Paul Lieberstein, Stephen Merchant, B. J. Novak, Michael Schur, Gene Stupnitsky
30 Rock - Brett Baer, Jack Burditt, Kay Cannon, Robert Carlock, Tina Fey, Dave Finkel, Daisy Gardner, Donald Glover, Matt Hubbard, John Riggi
Arrested Development - Richard Day, Karey Dornetto, Jake Farrow, Mitchell Hurwitz, Sam Laybourne, Dean Lorey, Tom Saunders, Maria Semple, Chuck Tatham, Jim Vallely, Ron Weiner
Curb Your Enthusiasm - Larry David
Entourage - Marc Abrams, Lisa Alden, Michael Benson, Brian Burns, Doug Ellin, Rob Weiss

Episodic Comedy
"Casino Night" - The Office - Steve Carell
"It Takes Two" - Desperate Housewives - Kevin Murphy & Jenna Bans
"Don't Look at Me" - Desperate Housewives - Josh Senter
"Bomb Shelter" - Malcolm in the Middle - Rob Ulin
"The Coup" - The Office - Paul Lieberstein
"Jump for Joy" - My Name Is Earl - Vali Chandrasekaran

New Series
Ugly Betty - Veronica Becker, Oliver Goldstick, Silvio Horta, Sarah Kucserka, Sheila Lawrence, Cameron Litvack, Myra Jo Martino, Jim D. Parriott, Marco Pennette, Dailyn Rodriguez, Don Todd
30 Rock - Brett Baer, Jack Burditt, Kay Cannon, Robert Carlock, Tina Fey, Dave Finkel, Daisy Gardner, Donald Glover, Matt Hubbard, John Riggi
Friday Night Lights - Peter Berg, Bridget Carpenter, Kerry Ehrin, Carter Harris, Elizabeth Heldens, David Hudgins, Jason Katims, Patrick Massett, Andy Miller, Aaron Rahsaan Thomas, John Zinman
Heroes - Jesse Alexander, Adam Armus, Natalie Chaidez, Aron Eli Coleite, Kay Foster, Bryan Fuller, Michael J. Green, Chuck Kim, Tim Kring, Jeph Loeb, Joe Pokaski
Studio 60 on the Sunset Strip - Eli Attie, Christina Kiang Booth, Jessica Brickman, Dana Calvo, Mark Goffman, David Handelman, Cinque Henderson, Mark McKinney, Melissa Myers, Aaron Sorkin, Amy Turner

Long Form - Original
Flight 93 - Nevin Schreiner

Daytime Serials
 As the World Turns

References
WGA - Previous award winners

2006
2006 film awards
2006 guild awards
2006 television awards
2006 awards in the United States
2006 in American cinema
2006 in American television
February 2007 events in the United States